Mikael Hakkarainen (born January 26, 1998) is a Finnish former professional ice hockey player.

Playing career

Hakkarainen began his career in the youth system of the Espoo Blues, playing for a variety of their U16 and U18 teams, before entering the North American junior hockey system in 2015 with the Brookings Blizzard of the Tier II North American Hockey League (NAHL). 

Hakkarainen, after a brief stint with the Chicago Steel of the Tier I United States Hockey League (USHL), spent the following three seasons with the Muskegon Lumberjacks of the USHL, posting 111 points in 126 games; during this time, he was selected in the fifth round of the 2019 NHL Entry Draft by the Chicago Blackhawks. During his tenure with the Lumberjacks, Hakkarainen briefly played collegiate hockey for the Providence Friars, but returned to Muskegon after just one game. After the conclusion of his time in Muskegon, Hakkarainen signed his three-year, entry-level contract with the Blackhawks on May 6, 2019.

After two seasons within Chicago's minor league system, Hakkarainen was traded to the Vegas Golden Knights on July 27, 2021, in exchange for goaltender Marc-Andre Fleury. Hakkarainen gained a degree of notoriety from the trade as its small return, in comparison to Fleury, the reigning Vezina Trophy winner, who was traded as part of the Golden Knights' salary cap cost-cutting.

Shortly afterwards, Hakkarainen was placed on waivers for the purpose of mutual contract termination on August 18, 2021. Hakkarainen subsequently cleared waivers, was released, and signed with TPS of the Finnish Liiga.

After five games with TPS, Hakkarainen signed with Västerås IK of the HockeyAllsvenskan, finishing out the 2021–22 season before departing the team afterwards.

Hakkarainen then announced his retirement from hockey on September 5, 2022, citing a diagnosis of congenital heart disease discovered during the offseason.

Career statistics

References

External links

1998 births
Living people
Chicago Blackhawks draft picks
Chicago Steel players
Finnish ice hockey centres
HC TPS players
Ice hockey people from Helsinki
Indy Fuel players
Muskegon Lumberjacks players
Providence Friars men's ice hockey players
Rockford IceHogs (AHL) players
VIK Västerås HK players